Elin Karolina Svensson (25 November 1879–?) was a Swedish missionary. She served with the Mission Union of Sweden in Chinese Turkestan (present day Xinjiang).

Bibliography
J. Lundahl (editor), På obanade stigar: Tjugofem år i Ost-Turkestan. Stockholm, Svenska Missionsförbundet Förlag, 1917

External links
Mission and Change in Eastern Turkestan (English Translation of select chapters of Mission och revolution i Centralasien)

Swedish Protestant missionaries
Protestant missionaries in China
Christian missionaries in Central Asia
1879 births
Female Christian missionaries
20th century in Xinjiang
Year of death missing
Swedish expatriates in China